Kamiah High School is a four-year public secondary school in Kamiah, Idaho, the only high school in Kamiah School District #304. Located in the Clearwater Valley of rural Lewis County in the north central part of the state, the school colors are maroon and white and the mascot 

At the south end of the city, the high school was built in 1914, and the current building on 9th Street opened

Athletics
Kamiah competes in athletics in IHSAA Class 1A in the White Pine League. It was formerly a member of the Central Idaho League with Grangeville and Orofino in Class 2A. KHS moved down to 1A in the summer of 2012 and won the 1A (Division I) state title in football that fall.

State titles
Boys
 Football (4): fall (A-3, now 2A) 1978, 2000; (2A) 2001; (1A, Div I) 2012 (official with introduction of A-3 playoffs, fall 1977)
 Track (6): (A-3, now 2A) 1979, 1980, 1981, 2001; (2A) 2002, 2012

Girls
 Track (4): (A-3, now 2A) 1982, 1987, 1988, 1989 (introduced in 1971)

Notable graduates
Ken Hobart, former CFL quarterback, Class of 1979
 Karleen Pardue-Williams/Karly  Rose, National Beauty Queen, speaker, Class of 1984
 Geoff Schroeder, state senator in the U.S. state of Idaho, Class of 1984
 C.J. Aragon 2010 National Intercollegiate Rodeo Association National Coach-of-the-Year, Class of 1993

References

External links

MaxPreps.com - Kamiah Kubs

Public high schools in Idaho
Schools in Lewis County, Idaho
1914 establishments in Idaho